Majs (or ,) is a village in Baranya County, Hungary. Residents are Magyars, with a minority of Danube Swabians and Serbs.

Until the end of World War II, the majority of the inhabitants were Danube Swabians, also called locally as Stifolder, because their ancestors once came at the 17th century and 18th century from Fulda (district). Most of the former German settlers were expelled to allied-occupied Germany and allied-occupied Austria in 1945–1948, as a result of the Potsdam Agreement.
Only a few Germans of Hungary live there, the majority today are the descendants of Hungarians from the Czechoslovak–Hungarian population exchange. They occupied the houses of the former Danube Swabians inhabitants.

Notablesights
 Serbian Orthodox Church, that was built in the beginning of the 17th century. This church is unique in Hungary and Central Europe, as its iconostas was stone built, instead of the usual wooden material.

Natives
 Béla Linder, military officer and politician

References

External links
 Street map 

Populated places in Baranya County
Serb communities in Hungary